Zak Mulligan is an American film and television cinematographer. He is best known for his work on Hustle, We the Animals, The Outsider, and Open Heart.

Career
Mulligan was born and raised in Ohio. He started his film career in New York City shortly after studying Photography at Arizona State University. In 2010 he won Best Cinematography at the Sundance Film Festival for his film Obselidia. In 2015, Variety listed him as one of the "10 Cinematographers to Watch". His TV work includes the Jason Bateman and Ben Mendelsohn HBO series, The Outsider. He collaborated with director Jeremiah Zagar on the Adam Sandler film Hustle (2022) and We the Animals (2018) which premiered at Sundance and was nominated for Best Cinematography at the Independent Spirit Awards. He is a member of the International Cinematographers Guild (ICG) and Academy of Motion Picture Arts and Sciences (AMPAS).

Personal life
Mulligan lives in New York City with his wife, designer Jessica Walsh.

Filmography

 2022 – Hustle
 2020 – The Most Dangerous Animal of All
 2020 – The Outsider
 2020 – Sundays at the Triple Nickel
 2018 – We the Animals
 2018 – Julian Got the Part
 2018 – ReMastered: Who Shot the Sheriff?
 2017 – Traces: Hypnotized
 2016 – Custody
 2015 – For Justice
 2015 – Bleeding Heart
 2014 – House of Cards
 2014 – The Sisterhood of Night
 2014 – 7 Deadly Sins
 2013 – King Theodore Live
 2013 – Blumenthal
 2013 – Always a Fire
 2013 – Futurestates

 2012 – Open Heart
 2012 – Emergency
 2012 – Chappo: 5-0
 2012 – Future Weather
 2011 – I'm Not Me Film
 2010 – Obselidia
 2009 – ReRun
 2009 – You're Gonna Feel Funny After
 2007 – Coney Island
 2007 – Getting Back
 2007 – A Piece of America
 2006 – Underdogs
 2006 – Pillow Talk
 2006 – Promenade
 2006 – The Rehearsal
 2006 – Killing Killian
 2006 – Purity

References

External links
 
 

Living people
American cinematographers
Year of birth missing (living people)